The Great Drain is a heritage-listed former farm and farm cottage and now motorcycle track, overnight accommodation and reserve located on the Wisemans Ferry Road, South Maroota in The Hills Shire local government area of New South Wales, Australia. It was built from 1795 to 1820 by probably by William Barren and William Harvey, stonemasons. It is also known as the Great Drain and two house sites. The property is owned by The Hills Shire Council and was added to the New South Wales State Heritage Register on 14 July 2000.

Access to the heritage site is from 274 Pacific Park Rd, South Maroota which, in 2019, was the site of Pacific Park Water Ski Gardens & Motorcycle Park.

History 
Charles Williams, who arrived on the First Fleet, came to the Hawkesbury district in 1794 after the death of his wife near his earlier Parramatta farm. He left his farm near Windsor  and at some time before 1810 occupied (without a grant) the land where the Great Drain was later constructed. The property was known as Williams' Farm and it is likely that he built the house with the stone foundations on the rocky slope to the south of the farmland, above the level of the floods of the early 19th century.

In 1810 the land, excluding the house site with stone foundations, was granted to Samuel Carr, who leased it to George Cox from 1813 to 1815. Cox ran pigs and grew grain. During the 1810s the rock cut foundations for a slab house known as Collingwood Cottage was cut, probably by stonemasons supplied through Andrew Johnston to freesettlers whose Portland Head Farm lay opposite.

Johnston's son and daughter-in-law, William and Mary Johnston, acquired the farm in 1819 and occupied the cottage known as Collingwood Cottage and probably constructed the Great Drain, again using Andrew Johnston's stonemasons.

The house constructed with stone house foundations remained on a riverside reserved strip although the intrusion of crescent reserve (portion 8) was granted to the Johnston family.

A couple still lived in the slab cottage until the 1930s when it was demolished. The swamp was stabilised by used tyres under George Johnston in the 1960s and portion ten became first a water-ski lodge in the 1980s and a motorcycle track on the 1990s.

Description 
Excavated by pick and by gunpowder (some drill holes). Rock cutting for sluice gates at deepest point, with joist holes. To the east of cutting an earthwork channel goes into a paddock.

The rock cut serves as foundations for slab house. The rock outcrop artificially drilled creating three rooms and verandah in an L-shape. Stone thresholds flanked by square post holes gave access and a fireplace and oven bases are carved into rock. Verandah supported by stone embankment.

Accessible only by water until s.

Condition 

As at 30 January 1998, the physical condition of the drain was good; the rock cut foundations were fair; and the stone house foundations were fair. The archaeological potential for all items is high.

Modifications and dates 
The following modifications have been made to the group:
Great Drain - concrete sluice gates (extant) inserted just west of original sluice gates; and
Rock cut foundations - slab cottage built on the foundations was demolished in the 1930s.

Heritage listing 
As at 19 December 1997, the three items in the group, dating between 1795 and 1830, are historically extremely rare and associated with a series of early Hawkesbury settlers (Williams, Carr, Cox, Johnston) predating official settlement down river. They are aesthetically valuable because of the siting in bushland of the house foundations and the dramatic vistas within the cutting of the Great Drain. They are scientifically extremely significant because they provide unique information about drainage and house building techniques.

Great Drain was listed on the New South Wales State Heritage Register on 14 July 2000 having satisfied the following criteria.

The place is important in demonstrating the course, or pattern, of cultural or natural history in New South Wales.

The Great Drain is a unique early work of magnitude to control drainage on the Lower Hawkesbury with a sophisticated sluice to repel tidal or flood water from the river. The rock cut foundations are unique in slab buildings and belongs to the Macquarie period. The stone house foundations are extremely early (1795-1810) and are associated with an interesting first fleet convict, Charles Williams.

The place is important in demonstrating aesthetic characteristics and/or a high degree of creative or technical achievement in New South Wales.

The Great Drain cuts a swathe through solid rock and can be entered from below as well as viewed from above. The stone house foundations are in a fine situation above the river in bushland.

The place has potential to yield information that will contribute to an understanding of the cultural or natural history of New South Wales.

The Great Drain is the only evidence for elaborate drainage works in so early a period outside Sydney. The rock cut foundations give unique evidence of a vernacular slab building technique.

See also 

Australian archaeology
Historical archaeology in Australia

References

External links 

Australasian Historical Archaeology, 11, 1993, pp130-138, Historical Archaeology and the Historian, by R Ian Jack.  The referenced publication has images and archaeological details of the site on pp131–133. Accessed 3 October 2019.

Bibliography

Attribution 

New South Wales State Heritage Register
Houses in Sydney
Historical roads of New South Wales
Canals in Australia
Farms in New South Wales
Parks in New South Wales
Articles incorporating text from the New South Wales State Heritage Register
1820 establishments in Australia
Buildings and structures completed in 1820